Bocchini is an Italian surname. Notable people with the surname include:

 Arturo Bocchini (1880–1940), Italian police chief
 Joseph L. Bocchini Jr. (born 1944), American politician
 Manuela Bocchini (born 1980), Italian rhythmic gymnast

Italian-language surnames